Andizeh (also Romanized as Andīzeh; also known as Adīzeh and Zndize) is a village in Lahijan-e Sharqi Rural District, Lajan District, Piranshahr County, West Azerbaijan Province, Iran. At the 2006 census, its population was 876, in 139 families.

References 

Populated places in Piranshahr County